Peak Hill is a hamlet in the South Holland district of Lincolnshire, England.

Peak Hill is on the eastern bank of the New River  (an artificial course of the River Welland), and on Barrier Bank, the former A1073 road. In October 2011 the A1073 was rerouted to the east of the hamlet and redesignated as part of the A16.

The elevation of the village is given as a 5-metre spot height on the Ordnance Survey maps, but the surrounding spot heights are all 2m.

References

External links 

Hamlets in Lincolnshire
South Holland, Lincolnshire